Poso Regency is a regency of Central Sulawesi Province of Indonesia. It covers an area of 7,112.25 km2, and had a population of 209,228 at the 2010 Census and 244,875 at the 2020 Census; the official estimate as at mid 2021 was 248,345. The principal town lies at Poso.

History
In 1999, Morowali Regency and Tojo Una-Una Regency were created out of eastern portions of Poso Regency. In 2007 there were calls to divide the remaining Poso Regency into two regencies to overcome religious-based conflicts; one new regency in the southeastern and western sectors would by named Tentena Regency (comprising the first twelve kecamatan listed below), while the residual Poso Regency in the northeast sector (bordering the Gulf of Tomini) would consist of the last seven kecamatan listed below

Administrative districts 
At the time of the 2010 Census, the Poso Regency was divided at 2010 into eighteen districts (kecamatan), but an additional 19th district (Pamona Pusalemba) was subsequently added by splitting off the western and southern villages of Pamona Utara District. The districts are tabulated below with their areas and their populations at the 2010 Census and the 2020 Census, together with the official estimates as at mid 2021. The table also includes the locations of the district administrative centres, the numbers of villages in each district (totalling 142 rural desa and 28 urban kelurahan), and its postal code.

Notes: (a) including 3 urban kelurahan. (b) all urban kelurahan.

Social

Religions 

Poso District Religious Office noted that the majority of the population in Poso is Protestant, with the number of adherents as many as 122,389 inhabitants. This is followed by 95,417 Muslims, 9,739 Hindus, 1,425 Roman Catholics and 267 Buddhists, respectively. The number of places of worship in Poso, consisting of 270 mosques, 500 Protestant churches, 36 Catholic churches and 71 temples.

Islam is the first religion which spread widely in Poso. Although the process is not known, Islam certainly been entered in Poso around the end of the 18th century. The migration of Mandar tribe of western Sulawesi region also proved influential in this process. This process culminated in the events in which Mandar people living in the area of Kadombuku (now Lage), forcing the local tribal people to convert to Islam and end up with a series of tribal wars between Mandar and Kadombuku. Christianity began to spread in the late 19th century, when a Dutch missionary, Albert Christian Kruyt sent by a Christian mission agency of the Netherlands Missionary Society to begin missionary in Central Sulawesi. After working for seventeen years, their efforts paid off when hundreds of people from To Pebato baptized on Christmas Eve, 25 December 1909. Central Sulawesi Christian Church (GKST) is a church organization that was established on 18 October 1947 in Tentena. GKST serves Central, West and South Sulawesi. In 2006, 188 thousand people registered to become members, and there are 376 congregations served by 625 priests.

Tourism 
Tambing Lake is located in Lore Lindu National Park, 3 hours drive from Palu and 100 meters away from Palu-Napu Road. In 2014, there are 3,000 foreign tourists visited Tambing Lake which is known as Endemic Bird Paradise with 30 percent of 270 kinds of birds are endemic.

Ecology 

Sulawesi black Ebony, also known as diospyros celebica, naturally can be found in Central Sulawesi (Parigi, Poso, Donggala), South Sulawesi (Maros), West Sulawesi (Mamuju) and Maluku. The International Union for Conservation of Nature (IUCN) has issued their red list in 2000 and D. celebica belong to the category of vulnerable species, which means that ebony is at the limit of high risk for extinction in the wild (vulnerable to exploitation).

Most of the endemic fauna in Poso is located in the area of cultural and natural heritage, such as Lake Poso and Lore Lindu National Park. Whitten (1987), Maurice Kottelat, and L.R. Parenti states that there are several species of endemic biota that is only found in Lake Poso, such as Xenopoecilus poptae (Adrianichthys poptae); Adrianichthys kruyti, Weberogobius amadi and Nomorhamphus celebensis. Other endemic fish is Anguilla celebensis, Xenopoecilus sarasinorum, Xenopoecilus oophorus (adrianichthys oophorus), Adrianichthys roseni; gastropods such as Miratesta celebensis; and some small shrimp (Caridina sp).

References

Bibliography

Further reading 

Regencies of Central Sulawesi